The Permanent Resident card (PR card) is an identification document and a travel document for permanent residents of Canada. It is one of the methods by which Canadian permanent residents can prove their status and is, along with the permanent resident travel document (PRTD), one of the only documents that allow permanent residents to return to Canada by a commercial carrier.

Originally named and still colloquially referred to as the "Maple Leaf card", the PR card was first proposed in 2001 as part of the Canadian government's overhaul of immigration and security laws following the September 11 attacks in the United States. After the 2001 passage of the new Immigration and Refugee Protection Act, the first PR cards were distributed on 28 June 2002.

Like Canadian passports, all PR cards are issued by Immigration, Refugees and Citizenship Canada (IRCC) and are the property of the Canadian Crown and must be returned upon request.

Starting from 10 November 2016, all travellers to Canada (except for Canadian citizens and permanent residents, U.S. citizens, nationals and lawful permanent residents, and travellers with a valid Canadian visa) are required to have an Electronic Travel Authorization (eTA) before boarding a flight to Canada. Hence permanent residents, including those from one of the visa-free countries (except the U.S.), need either a PR card or a PRTD to board a flight to Canada.

Design
There have been three types of PR card in circulation: the 2002, the 2009 and the 2015 version. As all PR card's lifespan cannot exceed five years, the initial 2002 and 2009 versions should be no longer in use.

All three versions of the card contain a maple leaf in the front of the card, hence earning the nickname "maple leaf card".

2002 version

The card is an ISO/IEC 7810 ID-1 sized (commonly known as credit-card sized) document. The front of the card contains the holder's photograph, name, an 8-digit ID number, sex, nationality, date of birth, signature and the card's date of expiration. For the back of the card, an optical stripe which contains the holder's information is available on top. Below it are additional information on the holder including their immigration category, colour of eyes and height, country of birth as well as the day the holder became a permanent resident. A machine readable zone is at the bottom.  The colour of the card is aqua, with graphs in purple and orange, and a maple leaf can be seen in the front.

2009 version

Comparing to the previous version, the 2009 version of the card, which was introduced on 24 August 2009, contains the same information as the previous version. The design, however, was significantly changed with a white background colour, a transparent window on the right side of the card, a second ghost image located in the transparent window, and the replacement of optical stripe with a 2-D barcode.

PR cards issued after 1 February 2012 no longer contain the holder's signature.

2015 version

In circulation since 25 November 2015, the 2015 version of the card has an RFID chip which can be used for future land border crossings. Unlike the biometric chips found in Canadian passports, the RFID chip does not store any personal data, but instead a unique identifier. When entering Canada from a land port of entry, the RFID chip in the PR card will be read by RFID tag readers. The unique identifier is then transmitted to a secure database and the permanent resident's information is retrieved by the CBSA officer who will have information even before the vehicle stops at the inspection booth. The design is similar to the 2009 version, although an image of the Peace Tower is shown on the background. The new version also removed immigration category and the 2-D barcode from the back of the card.

Machine Readable Zone 
There is a machine-readable zone at the back of the card. It consists of 3 rows each containing 30 characters. The format is compliant with ICAO Document 9303 Part 5.

Checksum calculation is the same algorithm used in Machine-readable passports. Multiply each digit by its weight. Weight of a digit depends on its position. The weight sequence is 7, 3, 1 and it repeats. All values are added and the result divided by 10 gives the check digit.

Application

New permanent residents

It is necessary to supply a Canadian residential address at the time of landing. If a Canadian address cannot be supplied at the time, one must be provided to IRCC within 180 days. There is no fee for a first PR card provided that the applicant provides an address before the 180-day deadline.

Existing permanent residents and renewals

Permanent residents as of 28 June 2002 and new permanent residents who did not provide a Canadian residential address, or whose PR card was expired, lost, stolen or damaged, must apply to IRCC's processing centre in Sydney, Nova Scotia, for a new card. The applicant must demonstrate he or she has resided for at least 730 days before the five-year period of the card's renewal application. In some cases, the PR card must be collected in person at an IRCC office in Canada.

Validity 
The PR card is normally valid for five years. However, it may be valid for one year for those whose PR status is being assessed by the IRCC.

As permanent residents must meet the residency obligation (minimum of 730 days in every five years) in order to renew PR cards, all valid PR card holders are deemed to have not lost permanent resident status and have the right to enter and remain in Canada during the card's validity. If, however, the Canada Border Services Agency (CBSA) officer at the port of entry considers the permanent resident may not meet the residency obligation, the person may be reported to IRCC and may be required to attend a hearing to determine his or her PR status.

A PR card's expiration date does not indicate that the holder's status as a permanent resident has expired, or will expire, on that date. It is the date after which the card must be replaced with a new card.

Permanent residents outside Canada

It is not possible to apply for the PR card outside Canada. Instead, permanent residents wishing to travel to Canada who do not have a valid PR card may apply for a single use Permanent Resident Travel Document (PRTD) which allows a journey to Canada as a permanent resident. The officers abroad will then determine whether the person still has permanent resident status.

Proof of permanent resident status
Whether one is a permanent resident or not is determined by the provisions of the IRPA. Under section 31(2)(a) of the IRPA, a person with a valid permanent card or signed confirmation of permanent residence document (electronic or otherwise) is presumed to be a permanent resident unless the IRCC officer determines that he or she is no longer a permanent resident. Similarly, under section 31(2)(b) of the IRPA, a person who is outside Canada without a valid PR card or signed confirmation of permanent residence document (electronic or otherwise) is presumed not to be a permanent resident unless proven otherwise.

The IRPA, however, does not specify the requirement for a permanent resident to hold a PR card, so a permanent resident who does not hold a valid PR card continues to be a permanent resident regardless of whether he or she is physically in Canada, if he or she satisfies the residency obligation and the status has not been revoked, although it would be difficult to prove the person's status in many cases.

Use as a proof of status and for visa-free travel

In Canada

A PR card is the most convenient way of proving status to authorities within Canada (e.g. provincial governments, employers, schools). All permanent residents have other documentation (such as original landing papers) which is also acceptable. However, there is no legal requirement for a permanent resident to carry a PR card at all times.

Outside Canada
For visa-free travels, Canadian permanent residents require a PR card, unless the person's passport in itself is sufficient for exemption. A Canadian PR card holder may travel visa-free to the following countries if not already exempt: 
 All Dutch Caribbean territories (90 days)
Anguilla (maximum 3 months)
Bahamas (90 days)
Belize (30 days)
Bermuda (maximum 6 months)
British Virgin Islands (up to 6 months)
Cayman Islands (60 days)
Costa Rica (30 days, PR card must be valid for more than six months)
Cuba (30 days, PR card and a current and valid passport required)
Dominican Republic (60 days)
El Salvador (not applicable to all nationalities)
Georgia (90 days in 180 days).
Guatemala (not applicable to all nationalities)
Honduras (not applicable to all nationalities)
Jamaica (up to 6 months)
Kosovo (up to 15 days)
Mexico (6 months)
Nicaragua (90 days within 180 days, not applicable to all nationalities)
Panama (30 days or 180 days)
Peru (6 months, nationals of China or India only)
Qatar (30 days)
Saint Pierre and Miquelon (90 days in 180 days)
Singapore (96 hours visa-free transit to or from a third country such as Canada, nationals of China or India only)
Saint Maarten (90 days)
South Korea (30 days when in transit, not applicable to all nationalities)
Taiwan (30 days, online registration required, only applicable to certain nationalities)
Turks and Caicos Islands (90 days)

For non-visa-exempt nationals, UK allows holders of a valid PR card issued after 2002 to transit without visa under TWOV program.

Requirement to enter Canada

A Canadian permanent resident has the right to enter Canada under section 27(1) of IRPA, provided that their PR status has not been revoked, hence legally speaking, a permanent resident does not need a PR card to enter Canada.

Due to the changes in visa policy, however, all permanent residents are required to hold a valid PR card to enter Canada by air unless they hold a U.S. passport. As any person can approach one of the Canadian land ports of entry along the Canada–United States border, a permanent resident does not need to hold a valid PR card to enter Canada from the United States, although they may face difficulties when boarding a commercial carrier (bus, ship or train).

See also
 Immigration to Canada
 Canada immigration statistics
 Canadian nationality law
 Green card, equivalent document in the United States
 Blue Card (European Union)
 Indefinite leave to remain, a British residence status equivalent to the Canada permanent resident card
 Western Hemisphere Travel Initiative

References

Further reading

External links
 Permanent Resident Card Overview - Citizenship & Immigration Canada

2002 establishments in Canada
International travel documents
Canadian immigration law
Residency
Permanent resident card